is a retired Japanese judoka.

Mitani is from Fukuyama, Hiroshima and began judo at the age of a first grader. He belonged to Japan Highway Public Corporation after graduation from Kinki University in 1991.

Mitani was good at Ippon seoi nage, Osotogari and Uchi mata sukashi.

In 1993, he won a gold medal at the Asian Championships held in Macau and at the East Asian Games held in Shanghai. He also participated in the All-Japan Championships 9 times from 1990 to 2000.

After retirement, Mitani coached judo at Japan Highway Public Corporation and All-Japan Youth Team.

Achievements
1990 - All-Japan Championships (Openweight only) 3rd
 - All-Japan Selected Championships (+95 kg) 3rd
 - World University Championships (Openweigh) 1st
 - All-Japan University Championships (+95 kg) 3rd
1991 - Pacific Rim Championships (Openweigh) 1st
1992 - All-Japan Championships (Openweight only) 3rd
 - All-Japan Businessgroup Championships (+95 kg) 2nd
1993 - Asian Championships (+95 kg) 1st
 - East Asian Games (Openweigh) 1st
 - Paris Super World Cup (Openweigh) 1st
1994 - Kodokan Cup (+95 kg) 2nd
1995 - All-Japan Businessgroup Championships (+95 kg) 3rd
1996 - Jigoro Kano Cup (Openweigh) 2nd
 - All-Japan Championships (Openweight only) 2nd
1999 - All-Japan Championships (Openweight only) 3rd

References 

Japanese male judoka
Sportspeople from Hiroshima Prefecture
1968 births
Living people